Funmilola Adebayo (born 27 August 1985) is a Nigerian judoka who competed, in the women's category. She won a bronze medal at the 2007 Pan African Games, a silver medal at the 2005 African Judo Championships and a gold medal at the 2004 Mauritius International.

Sports career 
At the 2004 International Tournament of Mauritius in St. Denis, Mauritius. Adebayo participated in the 52 kg event and she won a gold medal. 

At the 2005 African Judo Championships in Port Elizabeth,  Adebayo competed in the 57kg event and won a silver medal. In 2007 Africa Games held in Algiers, Algeria. She won a bronze medal having participated in the 63kg event.

References 

1985 births
Living people
Nigerian female judoka
Competitors at the 2007 All-Africa Games
African Games medalists in judo
African Games bronze medalists for Nigeria
20th-century Nigerian women
21st-century Nigerian women